Kara Nicole Mupo is an American women’s lacrosse player. 
Having played with the Northwestern Wildcats women's lacrosse at the collegiate level, she was named to the US national team for the 2015-16 season. In 2016, she was selected by the Philadelphia Force with their third pick overall in the inaugural United Women's Lacrosse League Draft.

Playing career

NCAA
On April 27, 2014, Mupo and the Northwestern lacrosse team hosted the University of Southern California Lady Trojans in a contest at historic Wrigley Field. With an attendance of 5,145 fans, the Wildcats prevailed by a final tally of 12-7. Mupo would lead the team with four goals scored, while senior captain Alyssa Leonard registered a hat trick.

Mupo was named captain of the Northwestern lacrosse team for the 2015 season, ranking third on the team with 38 goals and 41 points. In the season opening match, she would score five goals, attaining over 100 career goals. Of note, she would log the game-tying goal with 37 seconds, forcing overtime against the University of Southern California. In the aftermath of the game, which was contested at the Los Angeles Memorial Coliseum, Mupo had reached career goal 103. She would graduate with career totals of 173 points and 149 goals, respectively.

UWLX
On June 18, 2016, a 15-11 loss to the Baltimore Ride, Mupo would set a franchise record (and tie the league record set by Alex Aust) by scoring six goals in one game. Of note, she would score three of the first four goals in the game. Subsequently, her hat trick was the first in league history that was recorded in less than ten minutes. Amassing her three goals in a span of eight minutes exact, it stood as the league record.

Coaching career
After graduating from Northwestern, Mupo spent the 2015-16 academic year on the coaching staff at William and Mary. Hired on July 2, 2015, she served on the staff of head coach Hillary Fratzke. Among her duties, she also handled recruiting, travel arrangements and community service coordinator.

Awards and honors
2009 All-Suffolk League MVP 
Under Armour High School All-American
Big Ten Offensive Player of the Week (Week of February 9, 2015)
Inside Lacrosse Player of the Week (Week of February 9, 2015)
2016 UWLX All-Star Selection

References

Living people
American lacrosse players
Northwestern Wildcats women's lacrosse players
1991 births